Nuttgens is a surname. Notable people with the surname include:

Giles Nuttgens (born 1960), British cinematographer
Joseph Edward Nuttgens (1892–1982), British stained glass designer
Patrick Nuttgens (1930–2004), English architect and academic
Sandy Nuttgens (born 1964), British composer